Syed Masud Reza was a Bangladesh Awami League politician and the former Member of Parliament of Barisal-6.

Career
Reza was elected to parliament from Barisal-6 as a Bangladesh Awami League candidate in 1996.

Death
Reza died in 2013. His daughter, Ambareen Reza, is a businesswoman and founding director of Food Panda Bangladesh.

References

Awami League politicians
2013 deaths
7th Jatiya Sangsad members